Turkish Cultural Center (TCC) is dedicated to promoting Turkish Culture in the vein of the Gülen movement in the United States. TCC is a non-profit organization which operates under the Council of Turkic American Associations (CTAA) umbrella organization.

See also
 Gülen movement

References

Foundations based in the United States
Middle Eastern-American culture in New York City
Turkish-American history
Turkish-American culture in New York (state)
Turkish organizations and associations in the United States